The Tennessee Tech Golden Eagles baseball team, is a varsity intercollegiate athletic team of Tennessee Technological University in Cookeville, Tennessee, United States. The team is a member of the Ohio Valley Conference, which is part of the NCAA Division I. The team plays its home games at Bush Stadium at Averitt Express Baseball Complex.

See also
List of NCAA Division I baseball programs

References